Lichnoptera is a genus of moths of the family Noctuidae.

Species
 Lichnoptera albidiscata Dognin, 1912 (syn: Lichnoptera albidior Draudt, 1924, Lichnoptera albidiscata flavescens Draudt, 1924) 
 Lichnoptera atrifrons Dognin, 1912
 Lichnoptera cavillator Walker,  1856 (syn: Lichnoptera bivaria (Walker, 1856), Lichnoptera cavillator flavescens Draudt, 1924, Lichnoptera gracilis (Swinhoe, 1900), Lichnoptera reducta Draudt, 1924)
 Lichnoptera decora (Morrison, 1875)
 Lichnoptera felina Druce, 1898
 Lichnoptera gulo Herrich-Schäffer, [1858]
 Lichnoptera hieroglyphigera (Strand, 1912)
 Lichnoptera illudens (Walker, 1856) (syn: Lichnoptera pythion (Druce, 1889))
 Lichnoptera marmorifera (Walker, 1865) 
 Lichnoptera moesta Herrich-Schäffer, [1858]
 Lichnoptera moestoides Dognin, 1912
 Lichnoptera primulina Dognin, 1912
 Lichnoptera rufitincta Hampson, 1913
 Lichnoptera spissa (H. Edwards, 1887) (syn: Lichnoptera pollux H. Edwards, 1887)

References
 Lichnoptera at funet.fi

Pantheinae